Edmund O'Connor (November 1848 near Mallow, County Cork, Ireland – July 15, 1898, Binghamton, Broome County, New York) was an American lawyer and politician from New York. He was President pro tempore of the New York State Senate in 1895.

Life
He came with his parents to the United States when he was three years old, and they settled at Little Falls, New York. After the death of his father in 1862, he began to work at a railroad blacksmith shop, and studied at Little Falls Academy and Delhi Academy from where he graduated in 1868. Then he studied law in the office of Judge Rollin H. Smith in Little Falls, was admitted to the bar in 1870 in Oswego, New York. In 1873, he removed to Binghamton. From 1880 on, he was a trustee of the Binghamton State Asylum

He was a Republican member of the New York State Senate from 1890 to 1895, sitting in the 113th, 114th, 115th, 116th (all four 24th D.), 117th and 118th New York State Legislatures (both 25th D.); and was president pro tempore in 1895.

In the session of 1892, when Republican leader, he made a strong but unsuccessful fight against the re-apportionment of the state, and for his refusal to vote on an enumeration bill (voting reapportionment) he and two other senators were declared guilty of contempt by Lt. Gov. William F. Sheehan and their names taken from the roll. But they were supported by the judiciary committee in their position, were purged of contempt and their names restored.

His brother William O'Connor was a port warden of the Port of New York.

See also
List of New York Legislature members expelled or censured

Sources
 Political Graveyard
 Obit in NYT on July 16, 1898

19th-century Irish people
1848 births
1898 deaths
People from County Cork
Politicians from Binghamton, New York
Republican Party New York (state) state senators
Majority leaders of the New York State Senate
Politicians from County Cork
Irish emigrants to the United States (before 1923)
Censured or reprimanded members of the New York State Legislature
19th-century American politicians
Lawyers from Binghamton, New York
19th-century American lawyers